Lockjaw can refer to:

Medical conditions and diseases
 Trismus, a pathological condition in which the mouth is held shut by sustained spasm of the masseter (jaw) muscle, often observed in cases of tetanus
 Tetanus, an infectious disease of the central nervous system
 Temporomandibular joint dysfunction or TMD, often erroneously called TMJ

Music
 Eddie "Lockjaw" Davis, American jazz saxophonist
 Lockjaw (band), an English punk band from the 1970s
 Lockjaw (album), a 1995 album by Dance Hall Crashers
 Lockjaw (EP), a 2013 EP by Flume and Chet Faker
 "Lockjaw" (song), a 2016 song by American hip hop artist French Montana and Kodak Black
 "Lockjaw", a track which features American rapper Trunks and appears on the King Geedorah album Take Me to Your Leader 
 "Lockjaw", a track from the album Mack Daddy by Sir Mix-a-Lot

Other uses
 Lockjaw (comics), a character from Marvel Comics' Inhumans
 Locust Valley Lockjaw, an upper-class American accent